"Brand Suid-Afrika", which can directly be translated to "Burn South Africa," is a 4-track EP by South African punk rock band Fokofpolisiekar. It was released by Rhythm Records in 2006 and includes a music video of a previously released single, "Hemel Op Die Platteland (Acoustic)". The CD is about 14 minutes long without the music video.

Song interpretation
The writer states that his waking life is through the memories of old men, as if he has nothing to be proud of, no memories or identity of his own. This appears to be a reference that many of the older people in South Africa are still clinging to the Apartheid past and that the younger generation does not have an identity of their own but lives in the shadows of the past. Together with the image created of South Africa burning in the shadows and the reference to the 'Ossewa Brandwag' blowing up the municipality, this could be read as stating that people are struggling to move on and keep dredging up the past while the present/future is not being looked at.

The song also complains about the current state of South Africa and encourages the listener to do something about the situation,  rather than just complain. The music video (discussed in detail below) prominently displays a logo of South-Africa burning while the destruction of Afrikaans symbolism is shown throughout.

Track listing 

Extras

"Hemel Op Die Platteland (Acoustic)" music video

Music video 
In the music video for "Brand Suid-Afrika" we find the band playing alone in a camp terrain when suddenly a group of cars surround them, each car containing a different group of people. The groups consist of a dysfunctional family, two "boere" (farmers), a young couple, and a group of boys.

While the band plays, clips of the people are shown in which they at first appear to be normal, but the more we see of them, the more we realise that none of them are in fact as normal as they seemed at first. At first, we see the young couple talking in the back seat of a car, the family grouping together to take a photograph and the two "boere" sitting together on a car in front of a fire, while the one looks at the other one, and a bunch of "trompoppies" (South African cheerleaders).

When the song starts to become heavy things get out of control at the camp site. The couple start to undress and furiously make-out, after the family photograph is taken the husband starts arguing with his wife, the teenage daughter walks off, the 13-year-old son laughs at the situation and the domestic worker for the family just looks at the camera with a concerned, almost depressed look on her face.

The young boys have become hooligans and start beating another boy while fireworks start shooting around them and the boere take each other's hands, and near the end go to kiss each other, which we do not see (because the camera moves down) but we see them grabbing each other's backsides. And when the lead "trompoppie" drops her baton stick we see the lead singer of Fokofpolisiekar, Francois van Coke, talking in a bunch of microphones, twirling his finger around in circles.

The video ends with the band playing and the family photo appears in front of us but then bursts into flames and the logo of the "Brand Suid-Afrika" CD-single (An eagle with its heart visible standing on a circle with a picture of Africa where missiles are being dropped on South Africa, which is on fire; a play on the emblem of the Ossewabrandwag) appears in front of us and stays there until the music-video ends.

References

External links 
Official Fokofpolisiekar website
Brand Suid Afrika Video
Hemel Op Die Platteland (Acoustic) Video

2006 EPs